Jorge Gomes da Silva Filho (born 18 May 1954) is a Brazilian retired footballer who played as a striker.

Over the course of 13 seasons, he amassed Primeira Liga totals of 262 matches and 61 goals.

Football career
Born in Rio de Janeiro, Gomes played for CR Vasco da Gama before moving to Portugal. After a brief spell at C.F. União de Lamas he signed with Boavista FC, where he spent three seasons before joining fellow Primeira Liga side S.L. Benfica on 11 August 1979; he was the first ever foreign player to sign for the 75-year-old club.

During his three-year tenure, Gomes faced stiff competition from César, Zoran Filipović, Nené and Reinaldo, being sparingly used and leaving Lisbon after a disagreement with manager Sven-Göran Eriksson. He subsequently signed for S.C. Braga, going on to score nearly 50 competitive goals; he retired at the age of 37, after one year apiece with AD Fafe and R.D. Águeda (both in the Segunda Liga).

Honours
Benfica
Portuguese League: 1980–81
Portuguese Cup: 1979–80, 1980–81
Supertaça Cândido de Oliveira: Runner-up 1981

Boavista
Portuguese Cup: 1978–79

References

External links

1954 births
Living people
Footballers from Rio de Janeiro (city)
Brazilian footballers
Association football forwards
CR Vasco da Gama players
Primeira Liga players
Liga Portugal 2 players
C.F. União de Lamas players
Boavista F.C. players
S.L. Benfica footballers
S.C. Braga players
AD Fafe players
Brazilian expatriate footballers
Expatriate footballers in Portugal
Brazilian expatriate sportspeople in Portugal